Ofunne Kate Osamor (born 15 August 1968) is a British politician who has served as Member of Parliament (MP) for Edmonton since 2015. A member of the Labour and Co-operative parties, she was Shadow Secretary of State for International Development from 2016 to 2018. She is a member of the Socialist Campaign Group parliamentary caucus.

Early life and career
Ofunne Kate Osamor was born to Nigerian parents on 15 August 1968 in North London and grew up in Haringey. One of four children, her father died when she was a child and her mother, Martha Osamor, had to work "three, sometimes four jobs."

Osamor was educated at Fortismere School, Muswell Hill from 1979 to 1983. She completed an access course at Hackney College from 2003 to 2006, and subsequently read Third World Studies at the University of East London.

She worked for The Big Issue newspaper after graduating, but has principally worked in the NHS and been active in Unite the Union. Osamor was an executive assistant in a general practitioner (GP) out of hours service for 9 years and a GP practice manager for 2 years.

Political career

In 2014, Osamor was elected a member of the National Executive Committee of the Labour Party.

In the 2015 General Election, Osamor stood as the Labour Party candidate for Edmonton on the retirement of its former Member of Parliament (MP) Andy Love. Osamor obtained 25,388 votes, increasing Labour's majority from 9,613 to 15,419. Osamor was one of 36 Labour MPs to nominate Jeremy Corbyn as a candidate in the Labour leadership election of 2015. She was appointed as a Parliamentary Private Secretary to Corbyn in September 2015. 

On 14 January 2016, Osamor was appointed by Corbyn to the Opposition frontbench as Shadow Minister for Women and Equalities. On 27 June 2016, after the resignations of numerous members of Labour's ministerial team due to disquiet over Corbyn's leadership, Osamor was appointed Shadow Secretary of State for International Development. Osamor advocated an increase in aid funding for women's groups, and argued that international aid should be targeted towards schemes which aimed to reduce inequality as well schemes aimed at poverty reduction.

Osamor was re-elected as MP for Edmonton in the 2017 General Election. 

Kate Osamor was an active campaigner for the Remain campaign during the EU referendum and a prominent member of the ‘Love Socialism, Hate Brexit’ group.  

Osamor has served as the chair for the All Party Parliamentary Group for Nigeria since 2015. On 29 August 2019, she advocated the abolition of the monarchy when Queen Elizabeth II approved Prime Minister Boris Johnson's plan to suspend Parliament.

In October 2019, local party members voted for Osamor to face a re-selection contest to stand at the next General Election. However, the contest was scrapped, alongside others, when the snap 2019 general election was called.

In January 2022, Osamor and four other Labour delegates to the Parliamentary Assembly of the Council of Europe tabled ten amendments to a resolution on "Combating rising hate against LGBTI people". The amendments sought to include the word "sex" alongside gender identity, de-conflate the situation in the UK from Hungary, Poland, Russia and Turkey, and remove references to alleged anti-LGBTI movements in the UK. The delegates received both praise and criticism.

Controversies 
In January 2016, Osamor was accused of hypocrisy for advertising an unpaid internship which paid expenses only. Osamor subsequently withdrew the advert, claiming it had been a "misunderstanding".

After her re-election at the 2017 general election, she was accused of plagiarising sections of her victory address from Barack Obama's 2008 speech. According to Osamor, she "deliberately invoked a victory speech so famous that she thought it needed no introduction".

Parliamentary standards investigation 

In October 2018, it was revealed that Osamor continued to employ her son, Ishmael, in her Parliamentary office despite his drug-related convictions. Labour initially claimed that Osamor, who also lives with her son, knew nothing about his case until sentencing on 26 October. However, it later emerged that she had written to the trial judge asking for leniency before his sentencing on 19 October. She faced further criticism when it was revealed that she used parliamentary stationery and referenced her shadow cabinet position in writing to the judge.

Upon being doorstepped by reporter from The Times about the issue, Osamor threw a bucket of water, shouted profanities, and said "I should have come down here with a...bat and smashed your face open". Osamor was first referred to the Parliamentary Commissioner for Standards in November 2018, by a Conservative MP, and the investigation was expanded following the incident with the journalist. She denied any wrongdoing, and called the initial referral "politically motivated". 

Osamor resigned from the Shadow Cabinet on 1 December 2018, stating she needed "to concentrate on supporting my family through the difficult time we have been experiencing". She later tweeted that she was "deeply sorry for (her) emotional outbursts and ... working to better manage (her) feelings".

On 19 March 2020, the Standards Commissioner found Osamor guilty of two breaches of Parliamentary rules. The first breach was the use of House of Commons paper for her son's reference, and the second was the abusing and assaulting the journalist. She was ordered to produce a written apology for her actions. Osamor accepted that she broke the rules and apologised to the Commissioner, although she later commented that she was "the target of a witch-hunt, and that race and class were factors".

Personal life 
Her mother, Martha, is a Labour activist and politician who served as a Councillor and Deputy Leader of Haringey Council. She was appointed to the House of Lords in 2018, on the recommendation of Jeremy Corbyn, where she sits in Parliament alongside her daughter.

Osamor was diagnosed with dyslexia at university, to which she attributes some of her difficulties at school.

She had a son in 1989, Ishmael Osamor (born Ishmael Udi), with her then partner Kim Udi. Ishmael was employed in his mother's Parliamentary office, and served as a Councillor and Cabinet Member on Haringey Council. He resigned from his job and positions after his criminal conviction in 2018.

References

External links

1968 births
Living people
Alumni of the University of East London
Black British women politicians
Female members of the Parliament of the United Kingdom for English constituencies
Labour Co-operative MPs for English constituencies
People from the London Borough of Haringey
UK MPs 2015–2017
UK MPs 2017–2019
UK MPs 2019–present
English people of Nigerian descent
21st-century British women politicians
People educated at Fortismere School
Daughters of life peers
Black British MPs